The family Anniellidae, known as American legless lizards, contains six species in a single genus Anniella: A. pulchra, the California legless lizard, the rare A. geronimensis, Baja California legless lizard, and four more discovered in 2013.

Classification
The following species of Anniella are recognized:

 Anniella alexanderae Pappenfuss & Parham, 2013 – Temblor legless lizard
 Anniella campi Pappenfuss & Parham, 2013 –  southern Sierra legless lizard 
 Anniella geronimensis Shaw, 1940 – Baja California legless lizard
 Anniella grinnelli Pappenfuss & Parham, 2013 – Bakersfield legless lizard 
 Anniella pulchra Gray 1852 – California legless lizard
 Anniella stebbinsi Pappenfuss & Parham, 2013 – southern California legless lizard

See also
Glass lizard

References

External links

Anniella
Legless lizards
Lizards of North America
Taxa named by John Edward Gray